Mailing Operator and Courier Services Licensing Authority is a Bangladesh government regulatory agency responsible for regulating mail and courier services in Bangladesh. It is under the Ministry of Posts, Telecommunications and Information Technology.

History 
The government of Bangladesh passed Mailing Operator and Courier Service Rules on 11 November 2013. Mailing Operator and Courier Services Licensing Authority was established in February 2014 with Dileep Kumar Das as its chairperson.

In December 2020, 75 out of 1000 courier operators had taken a license from the Mailing Operator and Courier Services Licensing Authority and only half the members of Courier Service Association of Bangladesh had taken license from the authority.

References 

2014 establishments in Bangladesh
Organisations based in Dhaka
Government agencies of Bangladesh